Squalane is the organic compound with the formula .  A colorless hydrocarbon, it is the hydrogenated derivative of squalene, although commercial samples are derived from nature.  In contrast to squalene, due to the complete saturation of squalane, it is not subject to auto-oxidation. This fact, coupled with its lower costs and desirable physical properties, led to its use as an emollient and moisturizer in cosmetics.

Source and production
Squalene was traditionally sourced from the livers of sharks, with approximately 3000 required to produce one ton of squalane. Due to environmental concerns, other sources such as olive oil, rice and sugar cane have been commercialized, and as of 2014 have been supplying about 40% of the industry total. In manufacturing, farnesene is produced from fermentation of sugarcane sugars using genetically modified Saccharomyces cerevisiae yeast strains. Farnesene is then dimerized to isosqualene and then hydrogenated to squalane.

Cosmetics use
Squalane was introduced as an emollient in the 1950s. The unsaturated form squalene is produced in human sebum and the livers of sharks. Squalane has low acute toxicity and is not a significant human skin irritant or sensitizer.

Miscellaneous information
The hydrogenation of squalene to produce squalane was first reported in 1916.

In basic research, squalane is used as a reference liquid in tribology.

References

Triterpenes
Alkanes